Herbert Simpson (4 August 1886 – 8 March 1950) was a New Zealand cricketer. He played one first-class match for Auckland in 1917/18.

See also
 List of Auckland representative cricketers

References

External links
 

1886 births
1950 deaths
New Zealand cricketers
Auckland cricketers
Cricketers from Auckland